The 4th Critics' Choice Television Awards ceremony, presented by the Broadcast Television Journalists Association (BTJA), honored the best in primetime television programming from June 1, 2013, to May 31, 2014, and was held on June 19, 2014, at The Beverly Hilton in Los Angeles, California. The nominations were announced on May 28, 2014. The ceremony was hosted by comedian and actor Cedric the Entertainer and was broadcast live on The CW. Ryan Murphy received the Critics' Choice Louis XIII Genius Award.

Winners and nominees
Winners are listed first and highlighted in boldface:

Shows with multiple wins
The following shows received multiple awards:

Shows with multiple nominations
The following shows received multiple nominations:

Presenters

References

2014 television awards
2014 in American television
 004
2014 in Los Angeles
June 2014 events in the United States